Sandrine Agricole (born 13 March 1980) is a French female rugby union player. She represented  at the 2010 and the 2014 Women's Rugby World Cup.  In 2014, she was named World Cup Dream Team as flyhalf. Agricole started playing rugby since she was 11 years old.

References

1980 births
Living people
French female rugby union players
France international women's rugby sevens players